Ruijin is a county-level city of Ganzhou in the mountains bordering Fujian Province in the south-eastern part of Jiangxi Province. Formerly a county, Ruijin became a county-level city on May 18, 1994.

It was an early center of Chinese communist activity. In the late-1920s, the Republic of China (ROC) forced the Communists out of the Jinggang Mountains. The Communists fled to Ruijin and the safety of its relative isolation in the rugged mountains along Jiangxi-Fujian border. In 1931, Mao Zedong founded the Chinese Soviet Republic (CSR) with Ruijin as its capital; it was called Ruijing by the CSR. The Communist left in 1934 on the Long March after being surrounded again by the ROC.

During the Cultural Revolution, the Ruijin Massacre in September and October 1968 killed over 300 people in the county.

Ruijin is a popular destination for red tourism and ecotourism. It is a pilgrimage for Maoists from China and around the globe.

Administrative divisions
Ruijin City has 7 towns and 10 townships.
7 Towns

10 Townships

Climate

Transport
 Ganzhou–Longyan Railway

On 22 May 2016 the BBC reported that four cars fell into a sinkhole in Ruijin City.

References

Cities in Jiangxi
Ganzhou
County-level divisions of Jiangxi